Folau Fainga'a (born 5 May 1995) is an Australian professional rugby union player who currently plays at hooker for the Western Force. Folau is currently signed on with Rugby Australia and has been selected to play for the Australian national rugby team the Wallabies for the 2022 season.

Career
Fainga'a began his senior rugby career with Sydney University. He played for that club in the Shute Shield for three seasons starting from 2015. Fainga'a was selected in the Australian Under-20 team in 2015 and played at the World Championship in Italy. He was also part of the Sydney Stars squad for the National Rugby Championship (NRC) that year but did not play any matches for the team.

Fainga'a signed an extended player squad contract with the Brumbies for the 2018 season, joining the Canberra Vikings late in the 2017 season. After impressing in his play for the Vikings, Fainga'a was invited by Australian national coach Michael Cheika to join the Wallabies squad as a development player ahead of the third Test for the Bledisloe Cup and Barbarians F.C. matches in October 2017.

International tries 
As of 3 July 2022

Super Rugby statistics

References

1995 births
Australia international rugby union players
Australian rugby union players
Australian sportspeople of Tongan descent
New South Wales Country Eagles players
Canberra Vikings players
Rugby union hookers
Living people
ACT Brumbies players
Sydney Stars players
Rugby union players from Sydney
Western Force players